Xavier Delisle (born May 24, 1977) is a Canadian former professional ice hockey centre.

Biography
Delisle was born in Quebec City, Quebec. As a youth, he played in the 1990 and 1991 Quebec International Pee-Wee Hockey Tournaments with a minor ice hockey team from Sainte-Foy, Quebec City. He was drafted in the sixth round, 157th overall, of the 1996 NHL Entry Draft by the Tampa Bay Lightning. He played sixteen games in the National Hockey League: two with the Lightning (in the 1998–99 season) and fourteen with the Montreal Canadiens (in the 2000–01 season).

Career statistics

References

External links

1977 births
Living people
Adirondack Red Wings players
Augsburger Panther players
Canadian expatriate ice hockey players in Germany
Canadian ice hockey centres
Cleveland Lumberjacks players
Detroit Vipers players
Grizzlys Wolfsburg players
Granby Bisons players
Granby Prédateurs players
Ice hockey people from Quebec City
Montreal Canadiens players
Quebec Citadelles players
Tampa Bay Lightning draft picks
Tampa Bay Lightning players
Toledo Storm players